"Baby, Come Back" is a song by English band the Equals from their 1967 album Unequalled Equals.  Written by Eddy Grant, the song was originally released as a B-side in 1966 and was later released as a single in continental Europe before being released as a single in the UK in 1968. "Baby, Come Back" charted in multiple countries, including number one on the Belgian, Rhodesian, and UK charts in 1967 and 1968.

The song has influences from Motown and ska. In the 1990s, Pato Banton and London Boys recorded cover versions of "Baby, Come Back" that were hits in their own right; Banton's version reached number one on the UK Singles Chart in 1994.

The Equals version

Background and composition
The Equals were a group from North London, England formed in 1965 whose music was said to fuse pop, blues, ska, and beat.

"Baby, Come Back" has a 4/4 time signature compared to Motown and a beat driven by three guitars. Towards the end of the song, the band beatboxes in the style of ska.

Release
The song was first released in 1966 as a B-side to "Hold Me Closer". However, after impressive sales in the rest of Europe (it reached the top 10 in Belgium and the Netherlands) the song was re-issued in the UK on 1 May 1968 and reached number one on the UK Singles Chart for three consecutive weeks beginning 9 July 1968. In all the song stayed in the UK Top 75 for 18 weeks. In the U.S., the song charted at number 32 on the Billboard Hot 100 on 28 September 1968 and was the Equals' only track to chart in the U.S. top 40.

Eddy Grant himself released a new version of the song in 1984, 1985 and 1989, without much impact on the charts.

Critical reception
For AllMusic, Steve Leggett called the song "impossibly catchy." In a 2006 review, Freaky Trigger called the song an "excellent pop track that happens to have been made by a mixed-race, mixed-birthplace British-Caribbean band."

In his 2005 book Turn the Beat Around: The Rise and Fall of Disco, Peter Shapiro wrote that "Baby, Come Back" was "a big influence on disco."

Charts

Pato Banton featuring Ali and Robin Campbell version

"Baby Come Back" was covered by English reggae singer and toaster Pato Banton in 1994, who was joined by Robin and Ali Campbell of UB40. This version was different from the original in that it was in a more conventional, commercial reggae style and Banton added his own verses between the Campbells singing the original hook and chorus.

Critical reception
James Masterton wrote in his weekly UK chart commentary, "The new version is to be honest not half bad with toasting from newcomer Pato Banton and singing supplied by Ali and Robin Campbell from UB40, following Bitty McLean as the second protege they have helped into the charts. Easily a hit then and a possible contender for a Top 10 placing." Alan Jones from Music Week gave it three out of five. He added, "A remake of the old Equal' hit, updated and reggafied by Banton in a jittery ska style, with vocal support from UB40's Campbell brothers Ali and Robin. A happy sound, and a minor hit."

Release and chart performance
Banton's version of "Baby Come Back" was released on 19 September 1994. It entered the UK Singles Chart at number 16, reaching number one during its fifth week on the chart, where it stayed for four weeks. It was the fourth-biggest-selling single of 1994 in the UK. In New Zealand, the song entered the chart on 30 October 1994 at number three, then rose to number two the following week, before beginning a four-week reign at number one from 13 November to 4 December 1994. According to Virgin Records, about 750,000 copies were sold as of March 1995.

Track listing
 UK CD single
 "Baby Come Back" – 3:52
 "Baby Come Back" (dub) – 6:03
 "Niceness" (live) – 5:40
 "Gwarn!" (new version) – 4:21

Charts

Weekly charts

Year-end charts

Certifications

London Boys version

"Baby Come Back" is the first 1993 single from Europop duo London Boys. The single was produced by Ralf René Maué. The single was released in Germany and Austria, peaking at number 27 in Austria.

This was the last single under the London Boys name with the next and last two singles being under the name "The New London Boys".

Formats and track listings
 7-inch single
"Baby Come Back" – 3:24
"Baby Come Back (Instrumental)" – 3:23

 12-inch single 1
"Baby Come Back (Please Come Home Extended Version)" – 6:05
"Baby Come Back (Cavallino 12" Remix Rapino Brothers)" – 5:06
"Baby Come Back (Affinity Tranceuro Remix)" – 5:38

 12-inch single 2
"Baby Come Back (Teryiaky with the Rapino Bros Club Mix)" – 6:25
"Baby Come Back (Teryiaky Instrumental)" – 6:28
"Baby Come Back (Rapino 12" Handbag Mix)" – 5:20
"Baby Come Back (Affinity Tranceuro Mix)" – 5:40

 CD single 1
"Baby Come Back (Radio Edit)" – 3:24
"Baby Come Back (Please Come Home Mix Extended Version)" – 5:29
"Baby Come Back (Cavallino 12" Remix Rapino Brothers)" – 5:06
"Baby Come Back (Affinity Tranceuro Remix)" – 5:38
"Bob Marley (Reggae Reggae Rasta Rasta)" – 2:10

 CD single 2
"Baby Come Back (Original Version)" – 3:24
"Baby Come Back (Rapino 7" Handbag Mix)" – 3:25
"Baby Come Back (Teryiaky with the Rapino Bros Club Mix)" – 6:25
"Baby Come Back (Rapino 12" Handbag Mix)" – 5:20
"Baby Come Back (Affinity Tranceuro Mix)" – 5:40

Personnel
 Edem Ephraim – vocals
 Dennis Fuller – choreographer, backing vocals
 Ralf René Maué – writer, producer
 The Rapino Brothers – remixes

Charts

Other cover versions
"Baby Come Back" has been covered by many artists, including: 
Geno Washington (single from That's Why Hollywood Loves Me, 1979), 
Tight Fit (Back to the 60's, 1981), 
Bonnie Raitt (Green Light, 1982), 
Elektric Music (B-side to the single "Crosstalk", 1992), Chyp-Notic (I Can't Get Enough, 1992), 
Jay Ferguson
 Randy Bachman & Burton Cummings (Jukebox, 2007).
 , in Finnish titled as "Edes takas" (trans.) on their debut album Ei kontrollia (Love Records LRLP 258) in 1977.
A live version by Phil Seymour appears on his In Concert! album (Fuel Music Group)
An Italian version by The Rokes titled Non c'è pace per me (1968)

See also
List of number-one singles from the 1960s (UK)
List of number-one singles from the 1990s (UK)

References

External links
"Baby, Come Back" lyrics on Musixmatch

1966 singles
1993 singles
1994 singles
Songs written by Eddy Grant
UK Singles Chart number-one singles
Number-one singles in Belgium
Number-one singles in New Zealand
Number-one singles in Scotland
British reggae songs
The Equals songs
London Boys songs
1966 songs
President Records singles
Virgin Records singles
East West Records singles